Steffen Kretschmann (born 8 June 1980 in Köthen) is a German boxer best known for winning the bronze medal 1999 and 2003 at the amateur world championships in the 201 lbs/91 kg division.

Amateur
The southpaw won bronze 1999 in Houston when he had to quit with an injury in his fight against eventual winner Michael Bennett

In Bangkok 2003 he lost to Aleksandr Alekseyev and won bronze again.

Amateur highlights 
 Record: 144 fights - 122 wins
 1999, 2001, 2002 German heavyweight champion
1996 won the European European Cadet (under-17) championships in Aosta, Italy, as a light heavyweight.
1997 2nd place at Junior European Championship in Birmingham (England), lost the final to Vyacheslav Uzelkov (Ukraine)
1998 competed at the Junior World Championships in Buenos Aires, Argentina, as a heavyweight. Results were:
Defeated Roberto Cammarelle (Italy) PTS (12–4)
Lost to Odlanier Solis (Cuba) PTS (1–8)
1999 3rd place at the World Championship in Houston, lost in the semifinal to Michael Bennett (USA) by AB-2
2003 3rd place at the World Championship in Bangkok, Thailand. Results were:
Defeated Sergey Mihaylov (Uzbekistan) PTS (35–30)
Lost to Aleksandr Alekseyev (Russia) RSCO-3
2004 2nd place at Military World Championship in Fort Huachuca (USA) as a superheavyweight, lost the final to Roberto Cammarelle (Italy) by walkover

Pro
He turned pro for Arena and beat his first 13 opponents, among them Corey Sanders. Then he was surprised by Denis Bakhtov (KO by 1).

External links
 
 2003 results

1980 births
Living people
People from Köthen (Anhalt)
German male boxers
AIBA World Boxing Championships medalists
Heavyweight boxers
Sportspeople from Saxony-Anhalt